The 5th European Athletics Championships were held at Stadion Neufeld from 25–29 August 1954 in the Swiss capital Bern.  Contemporaneous reports on the event were given in the Glasgow Herald.

Medal summary
Complete results were published.

Men

Women

Medal table

Participation
According to an unofficial count, 689 athletes from 28 countries participated in the event, three athletes more than the official number of 686 as published.

 (25)
 (29)
 (9)
 (42)
 (7)
 (31)
 (49)
 (7)
 (41)
 (7)
 (3)
 (24)
 (4)
 (2)
 (12)
 (13)
 (35)
 (9)
 (24)
 (9)
 (68)
 Spain (4)
 (37)
 (50)
 (16)
 (46)
 (62)
 (24)

References

External links 
 EAA
 Athletix

 
European Athletics Championships
European Athletics Championships
European Athletics Championships
International athletics competitions hosted by Switzerland
1954 in European sport
Sports competitions in Bern
20th century in Bern
August 1954 sports events in Europe